The 2003 Astro Boy series is a remake of the 1960s anime black-and-white series of the same name; both series are adapted from the manga series of the same name by Osamu Tezuka. The series aired on Fuji TV from April 6, 2003 to March 28, 2004. A total of four pieces of theme music were used: two opening themes and two ending themes. The first opening theme is "True Blue" by Zone while the ending theme is "Boy's Heart" by Fumiya Fujii.

Episode list

Home releases

References

Astro Boy
Astro Boy (2003)